Farrukh Pasha ibn Abdullah (also known as Farrukh Bey) (died 1620–21) was the Ottoman governor of Nablus and Jerusalem in the early 17th century, and founder of the Farrukh dynasty, which held the governorship of Nablus and other posts for much of the 17th century.

Biography

Farrukh Pasha was born in Circassia, where he was either captured or purchased as a slave. He became a mamluk (slave soldier) of Bahram Pasha, a brother of Ridwan Pasha and sanjak-bey (district governor) of Nablus in the late 16th century. Under Bahram's patronage, Farrukh was well-educated and trained for a government career. In 1596, Bahram's influence helped Farrukh gain the appointment of Jerusalem Sanjak's subashi (officer in charge of public order). In 1603, following Bahram's death, Farrukh was appointed sanjak-bey of Jerusalem and later, in 1609, he was appointed sanjak-bey of Nablus. Farrukh established Nablus as the headquarters of his family. Between 1609 and his death in 1620–21, he served as the governor of Jerusalem or Nablus or both. The Damascene historian and Farrukh's contemporary, Muhammad Amin al-Muhibbi, described Farrukh Pasha as a "distinguished hero, of fearless heart" and as courageous and generous. 

He also held the prestigious office of amir al-hajj (commander of the Hajj caravan). He built a large caravanserai called the Wikala al-Farrukhiyya or Khan al-Farrukhiya for the Hajj pilgrims who assembled in Nablus. According to a description of the building by Turkish traveler Evliya Çelebi, Farrukh's caravanserai was "huge" and "similar to a castle and it has 150 rooms". It became one of Nablus's main commercial properties at least until the mid-19th century. Farrukh Pasha died while commanding the Hajj caravan en route to Mecca.

Legacy
The Farrukh dynasty that Farrukh Pasha established and headquartered in Nablus became one of the prominent pasha families of Palestine during the Ottoman era in the 17th century. Farrukh Pasha' son Muhammad ibn Farrukh succeeded him as sanjak-bey of Jerusalem and Nablus and as amir al-hajj until his death in 1638. Their rule in the Jerusalem and Nablus sanjaks (provincial districts) and as commanders of the Hajj caravan ended in 1670 with the death of Muhammad's son Assaf Pasha and the subsequent assignment of sanjak-bey of Nablus and amir al-hajj to Musa Pash al-Nimr. Members of the family still constituted a part of the elite classes of Jerusalem, Nablus and Damascus through the 18th century, but none served as sanjak-beys after Assaf's death.

References

Bibliography

  

1620 deaths
16th-century people from the Ottoman Empire
17th-century people from the Ottoman Empire
17th century in Jerusalem
Ottoman Palestine
People from the Ottoman Empire of Circassian descent
Political people from the Ottoman Empire
People from Nablus
Mamluks